Giacomo Naretti (29 August 1831 – 8 May 1899) was an Italian artisan and trained carpenter. He was born in a family of peasants in a small village. He migrated to Ethiopia, where he worked at the court of Emperor Yohannes IV.

He was part of the team of artisans who designed the throne of Emperor Yohannes IV, which is still preserved in Mekelle.

References

External links
 Naretti's Diaries in English

19th century in Ethiopia
1831 births
1899 deaths
19th-century Italian architects